Yakkan Toort / Dog Rock is a large, natural granite outcrop that is located along Middleton Road between Middleton Beach and the centre of Albany in the Great Southern region of Western Australia.

The rock is a prominent landmark and has the shape of a dog's head when viewed from the western side, leading to the name. Dog rock has become a popular tourist attraction for the area. The Noongar people know the rock as Yacka which means "wild dog tamed"; it is thought to be an ancient territorial boundary marker. Local Aboriginal people will not camp near the rock or shelter beneath it, although the reason is not known.

In 1921 the Council proposed demolishing the rock with explosives so as to widen the road. The idea was met with  protests and petitions along with an angry exchange during a council meeting resulting in the proposal being quashed.

The Royal Automobile Club labelled the rock a danger to traffic in 1938 as it encroached onto the road. The local authorities then painted the distinctive white collar around the base of the rock to make it more visible.

In the 1960s, the manager of the local radio station 6VA, suggested that the rock should be moved to the roundabout of Albany Highway, Denmark Road, North Road and Chester Pass Road. He believed that this would make it a more central tourist destination, and that the rock could be cut into slices and moved piece by piece and then rebuilt at the new site.

The rock was classified by the National Trust in 1973 and adopted into the municipal inventory in 2001.

The feature was dual named in 2021 to Yakkan Toort / Dog Rock.

See also
List of places on the State Register of Heritage Places in the City of Albany

References

External links

Heritage places in Albany, Western Australia
Rock formations of Western Australia
Middleton Road, Albany